The Lady Consents is a 1936 American romantic melodrama film directed by Stephen Roberts, starring Ann Harding, Herbert Marshall, and Margaret Lindsay. The screenplay was written by P. J. Wolfson and Anthony Veiller, from Wolfson's story "The Indestructible Mrs. Talbot".  RKO Radio Pictures released the film on February 7, 1936.

Cast
Ann Harding as Anne Talbot
Herbert Marshall as Dr. Michael J. Talbot
Margaret Lindsay as Geraldine "Gerry" Mannerly
Walter Abel as Stanley Ashton
Edward Ellis as Jim Talbot
Hobart Cavanaugh as Mr. Yardley
Ilka Chase as Susan
Willie Best as Sam (uncredited)

References

External links
 
 
 

1936 films
1936 romantic drama films
American black-and-white films
American romantic drama films
Films about divorce
Films about infidelity
Films based on short fiction
Films directed by Stephen Roberts
Films scored by Roy Webb
Films set in New York (state)
Films set in Utah
RKO Pictures films
Melodrama films
1930s English-language films
1930s American films